Garinish (Garinis in Irish, meaning 'near island') is a privately owned island lying off the coast of the Iveragh Peninsula, County Kerry, Ireland.

History 
In 1855 Edwin Edwin Wyndham-Quin, 3rd Earl of Dunraven and Mount-Earl (1812-1871), purchased Garinish Island as a holiday retreat from the Bland family of Derryquin Castle. He commissioned the architect James Franklin Fuller (1835-1924) and the building contractor Denis William Murphy (1799-1863, father of William Martin Murphy) with the creation of a house, later called "Garinish Lodge", and a garden on the island.

From 1900 onwards his son, Windham Wyndham-Quin, 4th Earl of Dunraven and Mount-Earl (1841-1926), developed the gardens on Garinish Island into a subtropical wild garden. It is still in existence today. The house, Garinish Lodge, was burned in September 1922 during the Irish Civil War (1922–1923), but later rebuilt. 
When Lord Dunraven died in June 1926, aged 85. he left Garinish Island to his only surviving child, Lady Aileen May Wyndham-Quin (1873–1962).

About 1950 Reginald Browne and his wife bought the island and restored the house and the garden after many years of neglect. Their sons continued with the replenishing of plants and trees.

Since the 1990s the island has been owned by Jacqui Safra, a Swiss investor and a descendant of the Lebanese-Swiss Jewish Safra banking family.

The garden 

Garnish Island has a fine garden, renowned for tree ferns. Cordyline australis (cabbage palms) thrive in this region. They line the pathway in the photograph on the top left.

References

Further reading
 Valerie Bary: "Houses of Kerry", Ballinakella Press, Whitegate, Co. Clare 1994, p. 95–96,

External links 

 Article from www.goldmedalwineclub.com
 Article from the "Irish Examiner", dated 10 January 2013
 Article from "FieldBryology" No. 98, dated June 2009
 Article from "The Bulletin of the British Pteridological Society", Vol. 7, No. 2, p. 203, dated 2010
 "Kenmare and District Garden Club" from www.kenmarenews.biz/wp/, dated 16. April 2019 

Islands of County Kerry
Gardens in County Kerry
Safra family
Private islands of Ireland